San Enrique, officially the Municipality of San Enrique,  is a 4th class municipality in the province of Negros Occidental, Philippines. According to the 2020 census, it has a population of 24,177 people.

The town's former name is called "Candaguit", named after the Candaguit River that runs through the town. The town is also notable for its signature delicacy buko pie. Notable tourism destinations include the Wisik Fishing Lagoon Resort, the South Midway Resort, and the Sitio Pasil beach front.

Geography

Barangays
San Enrique is politically subdivided into 10 barangays.
 Bagonawa
 Baliwagan
 Batuan
 Guintorilan
 Nayon
 Poblacion
 Sibucao
 Tabao Baybay
 Tabao Rizal
 Tibsok

Climate

Demographics

Economy

References

External links
 [ Philippine Standard Geographic Code]
Philippine Census Information
Local Governance Performance Management System

Municipalities of Negros Occidental